Ceryx is a genus of moths in the family Erebidae. It was described by Hans Daniel Johan Wallengren in 1863.

Species

Former species
 Ceryx aurantiobasis Rothschild, 1910

References

Smetacek, Peter (2010). "A new species of Ceryx Wallengren (Lepidoptera: Arctiidae: Syntominae) from the Kumaon Himalaya, India". Zoos' Print Journal. 2 (5): 894–895.

External links

 
Syntomini
Moth genera